Halling is a surname. Notable people with the surname include:

Jonas Halling (born 1989), Danish professional football player
Luovi Halling (1867–1928), U.S. Navy sailor and a recipient the Medal of Honor
Nick Halling, British sports broadcaster and journalist
Roy E. Halling (born 1950), American mycologist